Coylton Coila Football Club was a Scottish association football club based in the village of Coylton, Ayrshire.

History

The club was founded in 1877 and by 1879 had enough members to form 2 sides.  The club was named after Coila, the muse of national bard Robert Burns.

The club entered the Scottish Cup for the first time in 1880–81.  In the first round it was drawn to play Kilmarnock Portland F.C. at the latter's Hamilton Park ground.  Despite being a "very powerful-looking team", the village side was outmatched by the experienced Portland; the Coila conceded the first goal after ten minutes and by the end of the match had conceded seven more.

Coila also played in the Ayrshire Cup from 1878 to 1881.  Its last tie in the competition - and seemingly its last ever match - was a semi-final defeat to Annbank F.C. in 1880–81.  

Although the club entered both the national and local competitions in 1881–82, it scratched before its first round tie in both; it was due to meet Hurlford F.C. in the Ayrshire Cup and Beith F.C. in the Scottish.  The club also entered the Ayrshire Cup in 1883–84, but again scratched from the competition before playing, this time because the Coila fell out with the Ayrshire FA committee.

Colours

The club played in all white.  In the Cup tie at Portland, the club wore red and white jerseys, probably a change kit as Portland's regular uniform was also all white.

Ground

The club played at Bogside Park.

References 

Defunct football clubs in Scotland
Association football clubs established in 1877
1877 establishments in Scotland
Association football clubs disestablished in 1883
1883 disestablishments in Scotland